The Canadian province of Newfoundland and Labrador has 175 unincorporated communities that are designated as local service districts (LSDs) for the purpose of providing water, sewer, fire, garbage, street lighting, animal control, and/or road maintenance services to ratepayers within a defined area. The services in an LSD are overseen by a committee of five to seven elected officials and delivered by hired staff. The costs are recovered by the LSD committee through taxes levied upon residents and other benefitting parties in the defined area.

The Local Service District Regulations of the province's Municipalities Act is the legislation that provides the authority to designate an LSD. Upon receiving a petition led by a permanent resident of a certain area that is signed by the majority of permanent residents of that area, the provincial minister responsible for the Municipalities Act may issue an order to incorporate an LSD for the area. The order assigns the official name of the LSD, defines its boundaries, and sets out a process to elect a committee to represent the defined area.

List

See also 
List of designated places in Newfoundland and Labrador
List of municipalities in Newfoundland and Labrador
Local service board (Ontario)
Local service district (New Brunswick)

References